The British Academy Television Award for Best Features is one of the major categories of the British Academy Television Awards (BAFTAs), the primary awards ceremony of the British television industry. According to the BAFTA website, the category "includes factual programmes, not included in any other categories including cookery and cookery competitions, travelogues, gardening, property, fashion and all other lifestyle programming and studio discussions."

The category was first presented in 1999 under the name of Best Feature - Programme or Series although since 2000 the category has been presented just as Best Features.

Winners and nominees

1990s
Best Feature - Programme or Series

2000s
Best Features

2010s

2020s

Note: The series that don't have recipients on the tables had Production team credited as recipients for the award or nomination.

References

External links
List of winners at the British Academy of Film and Television Arts

Features